Raúl Sanllehí (born September 18, 1966 in Barcelona) is a Spanish football administrator and former Head of Football at Arsenal and Director of Football at FC Barcelona. Sanllehi initially joined Arsenal in February 2018 as Head of Football Relations, and was promoted to the Head of Football role following the departure of CEO Ivan Gazidis. He left Arsenal on 15 August 2020.

References

1966 births
People from Barcelona
Living people
Arsenal F.C. directors and chairmen